The Canton of Ault  is a former canton situated in the department of the Somme and in the Picardie region of northern France. It was disbanded following the French canton reorganisation which came into effect in March 2015. It consisted of 10 communes, which joined the canton of Friville-Escarbotin in 2015. It had 10,193 inhabitants (2012).

Geography 
The canton was organised around the commune of Ault in the arrondissement of Abbeville. The altitude varies from 0m at Ault to 127m at Yzengremer for an average of 70m.

The canton comprised 10 communes:

Allenay
Ault
Béthencourt-sur-Mer
Friaucourt
Méneslies
Mers-les-Bains
Oust-Marest
Saint-Quentin-la-Motte-Croix-au-Bailly
Woignarue
Yzengremer

Population

See also
 Arrondissements of the Somme department
 Cantons of the Somme department
 Communes of the Somme department

References

Ault
2015 disestablishments in France
States and territories disestablished in 2015